The Leader of the Opposition is a title traditionally held by the leader of the largest political party not in government, typical in countries utilizing the parliamentary system form of government. The leader of the opposition is typically seen as an alternative prime minister, premier, first minister, or chief minister to the incumbent; in the Westminster system, they head a rival alternative government known as the shadow cabinet or opposition front bench. The same term is also used to refer to the leader of the largest political party that is not in government in subnational state, provincial, and other regional and local legislatures.

In many Commonwealth realms, the full title for the Leader of the Opposition is the Leader of His Majesty's Most Loyal Opposition.

Current leaders of the opposition

Parliamentary systems

 Leader of the Opposition (Albania) (unofficial position)
 Leader of the Opposition (Cambodia)
 Leader of the Opposition (Comoros)
 Leader of the Opposition (Croatia) (unofficial position)
 Leader of the Opposition (Denmark) (unofficial position)
 Leader of the opposition (Germany) (unofficial position)
 Leader of the Opposition (Greece)
 Leader of the Opposition (Hungary) (unofficial position)
 Leader of the Opposition (Italy) (unofficial position)
 Leader of the Opposition (Montenegro) (unofficial position)
 Leader of the Opposition (Norway) (unofficial position)
 Leader of the Opposition (Portugal) (unofficial position)
 Leader of the Opposition (Spain) (unofficial position)
 Leader of the Opposition (Sweden) (unofficial position)

Westminster system

 Leader of the Opposition (Antigua and Barbuda)
 Leader of the Opposition (Australia)
 Leader of the Opposition in the Senate (Australia)
 Leader of the Opposition (Australian Capital Territory)
 Leader of the Opposition (New South Wales)
 Leader of the Opposition (Northern Territory)
 Leader of the Opposition (Queensland)
 Leader of the Opposition (South Australia)
 Leader of the Opposition (Tasmania)
 Leader of the Opposition (Victoria)
 Leader of the Opposition (Western Australia)
 Leader of the Opposition (Bahamas)
 Leader of the Opposition (Bangladesh)
 Leader of the Opposition (Barbados)
 Leader of the Opposition (Belize)
 Leader of the Opposition (Botswana)
 Leader of the Official Opposition (Canada)
 Leader of the Opposition in the Senate (Canada)
 Leader of the Opposition (Alberta)
 Leader of the Opposition (British Columbia)
 Leader of the Opposition (Manitoba)
 Leader of the Opposition (New Brunswick)
 Leader of the Opposition (Newfoundland and Labrador)
 Leader of the Opposition (Nova Scotia)
 Leader of the Opposition (Ontario)
 Leader of the Opposition (Prince Edward Island)
 Leader of the Opposition (Quebec)
 Leader of the Opposition (Saskatchewan)
 Leader of the Opposition (Yukon)
 Leader of the Opposition (Dominica)
 Leader of the Opposition (Fiji)
 Leader of the Opposition (Grenada)
 Leader of the Opposition (India)
 Federal opposition leaders
 Leader of the Opposition in Rajya Sabha (Upper house)
 Leader of the Opposition in Lok Sabha (Lower house)
 State level opposition leaders
 Leader of the Opposition (Andhra Pradesh)
 Leader of the Opposition (Delhi)     
 Leader of the Opposition (Gujarat)
 Leader of the Opposition (Jharkhand)
 Leader of the Opposition (Karnataka)
 Leader of the Opposition (Kerala)
 Leader of the Opposition (Madhya Pradesh)
 Leader of the Opposition (Maharashtra)                         
 Leader of the Opposition (Punjab)
 Leader of the Opposition (Tamil Nadu)
 Leader of the Opposition (Telangana)
 Leader of the Opposition (Uttarakhand)
 Leader of the Opposition (Uttar Pradesh)
 Leader of the Opposition (West Bengal)           
 Leader of the Opposition (Ireland)
 Leader of the Opposition (Israel)
 Leader of the Opposition (Jamaica)
 Leader of the Opposition (Japan) (unofficial position)
 Leader of the Opposition (Kuwait)
 Leader of the Opposition (Lesotho)
 Leader of the Opposition (Malaysia)
 Leader of the Opposition (Malaysian State Legislative Assemblies)
 Leader of the Opposition (Malta)
 Leader of the Opposition (Mauritius)
 Leader of the Opposition (Myanmar)
 Leader of the Opposition (Nepal)
 Leader of the Opposition (New Zealand)
 Leader of the Opposition (Cook Islands)
 Leader of the Opposition (Pakistan)
 Leader of the Opposition of Punjab (Pakistan)
 Leader of the Opposition (Papua New Guinea)
 Leader of the Opposition (Saint Kitts and Nevis)
 Leader of the Opposition (Saint Lucia)
 Leader of the Opposition (Saint Vincent and the Grenadines)
 Leader of the Opposition (Singapore)
 Leader of the Opposition (Solomon Islands)
 Leader of the Opposition (South Africa)
 Leader of the Opposition (Thailand)
 Leader of the Opposition (Trinidad and Tobago)
 Leader of the Opposition (Tuvalu)
 Leader of the Opposition (United Kingdom)
 Leader of the Opposition (Scotland) (unofficial position)
 Leader of the Opposition (Wales)
 Leader of the Opposition (Northern Ireland)
 British Overseas Territories
 Leader of the Opposition (Anguilla)
 Leader of the Opposition (Bermuda)
 Leader of the Opposition (British Virgin Islands)
 Leader of the Opposition (Cayman Islands)
 Leader of the Opposition (Gibraltar)
 Leader of the Opposition (Montserrat)
 Leader of the Opposition (Turks and Caicos Islands)
 Leader of the Opposition (Vanuatu)

Semi-presidential systems

 Leader of the Opposition in the French Senate
 Leader of the Opposition (Sri Lanka)

Presidential systems

 Leader of the Main Opposition (Turkey)
 Leader of the Opposition (Uganda)
 Leader of the Opposition (Zambia)

Other

 Leader of the Opposition (Guyana)

Historical leader of the opposition positions

 Leader of the Opposition (Northern Ireland)
 Leader of the Opposition (Rhodesia)

See also

 Minority leader, for a similar role in countries utilizing the presidential system
 Parliamentary opposition
 Shadow cabinet

Opposition leaders
Political titles